Dovydas Maščinskas  (born September 5, 1992), better known as Døvydas (or DOVYDAS aka; Revelstar Stellonaut, and previously known as David Smash), is a Lithuanian-born musician, composer, singer-songwriter and multi-instrumentalist. He was born and raised in Lithuania, and moved to the United States in 2012. He has appeared on national television in Lithuania, such as Lithuania's Got Talent 2009, Ring of Young Talents 2010, Lithuania's Pick for Eurovision 2011, and he was also featured in a book about Lithuanian rock music titled Lietuvos Roko Istorija – written by the national-award-winning Lithuanian author Mindaugas Paleckis.

Døvydas has headlined major music festivals in Lithuania and Poland; "Visagino Country 2010", "Bliuzo Naktys 2010", "Wegorzewo 2011", and "Most Rockowy 2010". The Dovydas Band competed at the International Blues Challenge 2016, and made it to the semi-finals, something not achieved before by any Lithuanian-born person. While at the International Blues Challenge he jammed with many musicians including the mountain dulcimer player Bing Futch.

Early life
Dovydas Maščinskas was born in Kaunas, the second-largest city of Lithuania. His father is a painter, and his mother stayed at home to raise him. Døvydas began playing guitar at the age 13, and after taking private lessons from older guitar-playing friends, he enrolled at the Kaunas Children Music School. Later, he studied classical guitar at Naujalis Music Gymnasium, and in 2010, he transferred to Kaunas Juozas Gruodis Music Conservatory.

Career
Døvydas started playing guitar at the age of thirteen in Lithuania, learning the drums, bass, piano, xylophone and harmonica shortly after. He was heavily inspired by a blues CD that his father bought in Germany, entitled Blues Giants Vol. 2, a compilation of blues songs from artist such as John Lee Hooker, Lightnin' Hopkins, BB King, Etta James, and Memphis Slim. Døvydas says, "It was magic. That CD with those songs was like having an invitation letter to Hogwarts. Not only the music was captivating and enchanting, they were singing in this amazing language, and they lived in this distant part of the world that I've only seen on television."

During school he formed his first band, "David Smash and the Smash Band", which was later shortened to simply "David Smash Band". The group began playing local competitions and festivals and after their appearances on national television, they received invitations to headline major music festivals in Lithuania and Poland. He linked up with local blues musician Steve Arvey and moved to Florida at the age of 19. In his first two years in Sarasota, Døvydas expanded his musical repertoire and integrated himself into the local music scene. After signing a contract with the Del Couch Music Education Foundation and Howling Dog Studios, Døvydas has released two CDs in the United States, one of them titled State Of Sunshine.

Dovydas is busking around Sarasota, Florida, where he asks people to sing and records them. One of his most popular videos is Tennessee Whiskey by Vere Hill.

Musical influences
Døvydas was influenced by American music recordings owned by his parents. Among his most notable influences, he lists Johnny Cash, Ray Charles, Elvis Presley, James Brown, Jerry Lee Lewis, Nat King Cole and Dean Martin. Døvydas references Steve Vai as one of his favorite guitarists.  Døvydas' impromptu rendition of the song "Tender Surrender" by Vai gained him significant success within the YouTube community and viewership has steadily increased since that time.

References

Lithuanian musicians
1992 births
Living people